Grand Besançon Métropole is the urban community (communauté urbaine), an intercommunal structure, centred on the city of Besançon. It is located in the Doubs department, in the Bourgogne-Franche-Comté region, northeastern France.

It was created in December 2000 Communauté d'agglomération Grand Besançon, which was transformed into an urban community on 1 July 2019. Its area is 528.6 km2.

Its population was 196,278 in 2020, of which 118,258 (60%) in Besançon proper. Its budget is € 339.3 million (2022).

Composition
The urban community consists of the following 68 communes:

Amagney
Audeux
Les Auxons
Avanne-Aveney
Besançon
Beure
Bonnay
Boussières
Braillans
Busy
Byans-sur-Doubs
Chalèze
Chalezeule
Champagney
Champoux
Champvans-les-Moulins
Châtillon-le-Duc
Chaucenne
Chemaudin et Vaux
La Chevillotte
Chevroz
Cussey-sur-l'Ognon
Dannemarie-sur-Crète
Deluz
Devecey
École-Valentin
Fontain
Franois
Geneuille
Gennes
Grandfontaine
Le Gratteris
Larnod
Mamirolle
Marchaux-Chaudefontaine
Mazerolles-le-Salin
Mérey-Vieilley
Miserey-Salines
Montfaucon
Montferrand-le-Château
Morre
Nancray
Noironte
Novillars
Osselle-Routelle
Palise
Pelousey
Pirey
Pouilley-Français
Pouilley-les-Vignes
Pugey
Rancenay
Roche-lez-Beaupré
Roset-Fluans
Saint-Vit
Saône
Serre-les-Sapins
Tallenay
Thise
Thoraise
Torpes
Vaire
Velesmes-Essarts
Venise
La Vèze
Vieilley
Villars-Saint-Georges
Vorges-les-Pins

References

Besancon
Besancon
Bourgogne-Franche-Comté region articles needing translation from French Wikipedia